Udenna Corporation is a holdings company made by the Udenna Group of Companies which is based in Davao City, Philippines, and founded by businessman Dennis Uy. Primarily involved in the petroleum and shipping industry in its initial years, the company later diversified and became involved in other sectors such as real estate and telecommunications.

History
The Udenna Corporation was incorporated on March 19, 2002. It was founded by Davao City businessman Dennis Uy who decided to establish the company after quitting his family businesses in Mindanao. "Udenna" was derived from Uy's full name, Dennis Ang Uy. Phoenix Petroleum was organized as the first unit of Udenna. It was first involved in managing oil terminals as the Davao Oil Terminal and Services Corporation in the early 2000s but was later renamed Phoenix Petroleum in 2005 and went on retailing petroleum products. Phoenix Petroleum went public in 2007.

To supplement Udenna's petroleum business, Chelsea Shipping Corporation was established in 2006, marking the corporation's entry into the shipping and logistics industry. Within the first year of the administration of President Rodrigo Duterte in 2016–2017, Udenna Corporation had various acquisitions. Udenna secured permission from the Philippine Amusement and Gaming Corporation to develop a casino resort near Mactan–Cebu International Airport. It also entered the liquefied petroleum gas (LPG) industry and acquired Enderun Colleges.

In November 2017, Udenna took over the development of the former Global Gateway Logistics City at the Clark Freeport Zone in Pampanga, later relaunched as Clark Global City.

Mislatel (now known as Dito Telecommunity), a consortium by Udenna and China Telecom, won the government-sanctioned bidding that would allow the consortium to become the third primary telecommunications provider in the Philippines challenging the duopoly of PLDT and Globe Telecom.

Also, in late 2018, Udenna Corporation began acquiring Philippine Stock Exchange-listed ISM Communications Corporation with the intention of backdoor listing Udenna on the stock exchange. Upon the completion of the process, Udenna Corporation will become a wholly owned subsidiary of ISM, but Dennis Uy and his wife will effectively own ISM's shares and ISM will be renamed Udenna Holdings Corporation. However, the planned backdoor listing was aborted and in March 2020, ISM changed its corporate name to Dito CME Holdings Corporation.

In November 2020, Dito CME Holdings Corporation announced its share swap deal with Udenna to indirectly own its stake in Dito Telecommunity. As part of a deal, Dito CME will hold a 100% stake in Udenna's subsidiary, Udenna CME Holdings Corporation, which co-owns one of Dito's parent companies, Dito Holdings Corporation (along with Chelsea Logistics). The deal made Udenna Corporation become as a parent company of Dito CME.

Dennis Uy's Udenna Corporation bought 100 million common shares of Atok-Big Wedge Co. Inc. at the negotiated price of P2.00 per share or a total of P200,000,000. Dennis Uy is also a director and vice chairman of Atok-Big Wedge. He has an existing 1,000 direct shares in the company. Atok-Big Wedge Co, Inc. a listed corporation in PSE, has 20% ownership of United Kingdom-based Forum Energy Ltd. which has the right of oil exploration in SC72 in the South China Sea. Forum Energy Ltd. has ongoing talks with China for joint oil exploration after President Duterte, a close friend of Dennis Uy, lift the moratorium on oil exploration.

Subsidiaries
Oil, gas, and retail
Phoenix Petroleum Philippines Inc. - is one of the principal subsidiaries of Udenna. 
Phoenix LPG Philippines Inc.
PNX Petroleum Singapore Pte Ltd. 
Phoenix Gas Vietnam LLC 
Phoenix Asphalt Philippines, Inc.
Philippine FamilyMart CVS, Inc. (PFM) - Philippine franchise of the Japan-based convenience store chain. Acquired FamilyMart Philippines from the co-ownership of Ayala Corporation, Rustan's Group , and Itochu in 2018.

Logistics
Chelsea Logistics & Infrastructure Holdings Corp., a holdings company, deals with Udenna's business in the shipping and logistics industry.

Real estate
Udenna Corporation also manages the Clark Global City through its subsidiary. 
Clark City Global Corporation - which holds the majority of Global Gateway Development Corporation, the leaseholder of the development in the Clark Freeport Zone.

Education
Enderun Colleges

Telecommunications
 Dito CME Holdings Corporation - a publicly-listed company, formerly known as ISM Communications Corporation.
 Dito Holdings Corporation - a joint-venture subsidiary of Udenna owned a 60% stake in Dito Telecommunity (co-owned by Dito CME through Udenna CME and Chelsea Logistics). Chinese state-owned China Telecommunications Corporation owned the rest of the stake. (40%)

Hospitality
 PH Resort Group - PH Resorts Group is a gaming and hospitality business holding entity.
Donatela Hotel - Luxury Resort located in Panglao, Bohol. Sits on 7.5 hectares of prime property. Acquired in November 2017, the resort features twelve private & luxurious villas.
Emerald Bay Resort and Casino - Located in Mactan, Cebu. 
Emerald Bay Resort and Casino - was designed by world-renowned Steelman Partners. The five-star hotel and casino is targeted to open in 2020.
The Base - Currently in the design and development phase, The Base is scheduled to open in 2022. 
Located in a 4.4-hectare property in Clark Global City, Pampanga, The Base is set to be a premiere adventure-themed integrated resort.

Retail and food
 Eight-8-Ate Holdings, Inc.
Wendy's Philippines - Philippine franchise of the American burger fast-food chain. Acquired in 2019 through its subsidiary Eight-8-Ate Holdings.
Conti's - bakeshop and restaurant chain. Udenna acquired a 70% stake in Conti's Holdings Corporation in 2018.
L3 Concrete

Controversies
The acquiring of the Malampaya stake to Udenna has been under scrutiny by some senators and concerned citizens.

See also
Dito CME Holdings Corporation
Malampaya gas field

References."

 
2002 establishments in the Philippines
Conglomerate companies of the Philippines
Holding companies of the Philippines
Companies established in 2002
Companies based in Davao City